Penza Governorate was an administrative division (a guberniya) of the Russian Empire and Russian SFSR, located in the Volga Region. It existed from 1796 to 1797 and again from 1801 to 1928; its seat was in the city of Penza.

Uyezds
Penza Governorate was subdivided into ten uyezds:

 Gorodishchensky Uyezd
 Insarsky Uyezd
 Kerensky Uyezd
 Krasnoslobodsky Uyezd
 Mokshansky Uyezd
 Narovchatsky Uyezd
 Nizhnelomovsky Uyezd
 Penzensky Uyezd
 Saransky Uyezd
 Chembarsky Uyezd

Demographics
At the time of the Russian Empire Census of 1897, Penza Governorate had a population of 1,470,474. Of these, 83.0% spoke Russian, 12.8% Mordvin, 4.0% Tatar, 0.1% Ukrainian and 0.1% Polish as their native language.

References

 
1796 establishments in the Russian Empire
1797 disestablishments in the Russian Empire
1801 establishments in the Russian Empire
1928 disestablishments in Russia
States and territories disestablished in 1928
States and territories disestablished in 1797
States and territories established in 1796
States and territories established in 1801
History of Penza Oblast
History of Mordovia
History of Ulyanovsk Oblast